Churchill was an alternative band from Denver. The band was founded as a two-piece by Tim Bruns and Mike Morter in 2008, but by 2009 it had expanded to five members. The group self-released a self-titled EP in 2009 and a full-length titled Happy/Sad in 2011. They originally released their second EP, entitled Change in early 2012. The band signed with A&M/Octone Records and later that year they re-released Change. The EP reached #9 on the Billboard Heatseekers chart. The title track became a hit single, reaching #17 on the Alternative Songs chart and was an iTunes Free Song of the Week in early 2013. The band had planned to release their next full-length album in 2013.

Churchill was the main supporting act during the European leg of Pink's The Truth About Love Tour.

On July 12, 2013, Churchill broke up and cancelled all upcoming appearances, according to a band representative.

Discography

Studio albums
Happy Sad (2011)

Extended plays
Churchill EP (2009)
Change EP (A&M/Octone Records, 2012)
The War Within EP (A&M/Octone Records, 2013)

References

External links
 

Musical groups from Denver
Alternative rock groups from Colorado
American folk rock groups
Musical groups established in 2009
Musical groups disestablished in 2013